Kenyan–Thai relations are bilateral relations between Thailand and Kenya. Kenya has an embassy in Bangkok which opened in 2006. The former Kenyan Consulate in Bangkok was opened in 1992.

History

In 1967, diplomatic relations were formed. In 1978 Thailand opened its embassy in Nairobi.

Official visits
Cabinet Secretary (CS) for Foreign Affairs Kenya Monica Juma met with both PM Prayut Chan-o-cha and her Thai counterpart Don Pramudwinai. She held discussions with both leaders concerning furthering bilateral and multilateral relations. Both sides also agreed to convene the 2nd Joint Commission Cooperation (JCC) in 2020.

Incidents
Deputy PM Prawit Wongsuwon was quoted saying that it was OK that no Thai people died in the Nairobi DusitD2 complex attack in Nairobi, Kenya. Prawit was strongly criticised for his statement. The Dusit hotels are Thai owned.

Trade
In 2008 trade between Kenya and Thailand was worth KES. 15 billion (US$162.82 million).

Kenya exported goods worth KES. 1.2 billion (US$32.42 million) to Thailand. In addition, Thailand exported goods worth KES. 12 billion (US$130.41 million).

Kenya's main exports to Thailand include: chemical products, ore, other metal, and iron.

Thailand's main exports to Kenya include: plastic resin, motor vehicles, equipment and components, granulated sugar and finished clothing.

See also
Foreign relations of Kenya
Foreign relations of Thailand

References

External links
Embassy of Kenya in Bangkok
Embassy of Thailand in Nairobi

Kenya
Thailand